The Reus Imperials is an American football team from Reus. They were founded in late 1989 by Josep Lluis Castán and Solanellas. He moved his residence from Barcelona to Reus, when he did this.

Honours

National
 Serie B Championships (4): 2008, 2009, 2010, 2015

Regional
 Catalan League (8): 1998, 1999, 2006, 2008, 2009, 2011, 2012, 2013
 Catalan Cup (2): 1998, 1999

References

American football teams established in 1989
Sport in Reus
1989 establishments in Spain
American football teams in Catalonia